Itingen railway station is a railway station in the municipality of Itingen, in the Swiss canton of Basel-Landschaft. It is an intermediate stop on the standard gauge Hauenstein line of Swiss Federal Railways.

Services 
 the following services stop at Itingen:

 Basel trinational S-Bahn : half-hourly service between Laufen and Olten, with every other train continuing from Laufen to Porrentruy.

References

External links 
 
 

Railway stations in Basel-Landschaft
Swiss Federal Railways stations